The Pârâul Fierului (also: Valea Fierului) is a right tributary of the Râul Galben in Romania. It flows into the Râul Galben upstream from Ștei.

References

Rivers of Romania
Rivers of Hunedoara County